WZLK (107.5 FM, "Z-107.5") is a radio station licensed to serve Virgie, Kentucky, serving the Pikeville, Kentucky area. The station is owned by Lynn Parrish, through licensee Mountain Top Media LLC.

It airs a contemporary hit radio (CHR) format. Notable programming includes syndicated The Kidd Kraddick Morning Show , Tino Cochino Radio on afternoons, Zach Sang on Evenings, and Hollywood Hamilton on weekends.
The station has been assigned these call letters by the Federal Communications Commission since August 21, 1992.

History
WZLK signed on the air in August 1992 under the ownership of Kenneth and Lonnie Osborne. The first songs to play were that of a classic country nature blended with Kentucky bluegrass. The station was co-owned with WLSI in Pikeville, KY. WZLK became a second country outlet in Pike County. FCC.GOV

The ownership changed in 2003 when WZLK and WLSI were purchased by East Kentucky Broadcasting. FCC.GOV

In March 2005, East Kentucky Broadcasting changed the format of WZLK to a hybrid CHR/AR A.K.A. Active Rock 40 format, giving Pike County a local outlet for both Top 40 and Rock music. The first song played on Z 107.5 in March 2005 was "Self Esteem" by The Offspring.

On September 2, 2015, WZLK flipped to a pure fully fledged Top 40/CHR format.

Effective May 29, 2019, East Kentucky Broadcasting sold WZLK, their eight sister stations, and five translators to Mountain Top Media LLC for $2.85 million.

References

External links
WZLK official website

ZLK
Radio stations established in 1992
Pike County, Kentucky
1992 establishments in Kentucky
Contemporary hit radio stations in the United States